Majda Grbac (born 27 May 1946) is a Slovenian actress.

She won the Golden Arena Award for Best Leading Actress award in 1974 for her role in Let mrtve ptice (English: The Flight of the Dead Bird).

References

External links
 
 1981/2 photo

1946 births
Living people
Slovenian stage actresses
Yugoslav actresses
Golden Arena winners
Actors from Maribor
Slovenian television actresses
Slovenian film actresses
20th-century Slovenian actresses
21st-century Slovenian actresses